Alina Surmacka Szczesniak (July 8, 1925 – July 23, 2016) was a Polish-born American food scientist best known for her contributions to food texture.

Education and career

She was the daughter of Wladysław Surmacki, who was to be President of the International Federation of Surveyors (FIG) in 1942 but did not survive the Second World War.
In 2002, Szcześniak received the plaque of Honorary President of FIG on behalf of her father.

Szcześniak attended Bryn Mawr College as a foreign student after the Second World War, which she spent in her native Poland.

Szcześniak earned her graduate degree in food technology at the Massachusetts Institute of Technology, then worked for General Foods in the field of food chemistry, focusing on texture studies. She worked at General Foods from 1952 until her 1986 retirement, where she retired as a principal scientist.

Szcześniak developed the now-standard Sensory Texture Profile Analysis, which analyzes, quantifies and places in correct sequence all textural properties perceived from the moment a piece of food is placed in the mouth until the last particle is swallowed.

In 1969, Szcześniak was a Founding Editor of the Journal of Texture Studies and served for 10 years in that role.

Awards and honours
In 1985, Szcześniak became the first woman to receive the Nicholas Appert Award, the highest honor bestowed upon its members by the Institute of Food Technologists (IFT). It commended her pioneering work on food texture that led to its recognition as an important quality attribute affecting consumer acceptance and to its organization as a subdiscipline of food science. She is the only woman thus far to ever win the Nicholas Appert Award. Dr Szcześniak was elected an IFT Fellow in 1981.

References

Sources
"People News: Alina S. Szcześniak." Food Technology. September 2002: p. 16.
 Aleksandra Ziolkowska-Boehm, Amerykanie z wyboru [Americans by Choice], Warsaw 1998, pg. 92–111,

External links

List of IFT past award winners
List of IFT Fellows 

1925 births
2016 deaths
American food chemists
American food scientists
Polish emigrants to the United States
Fellows of the Institute of Food Technologists
Bryn Mawr College alumni
Massachusetts Institute of Technology alumni
Polish chemists
Polish women chemists